Christiana may refer to:

 Christiana incident (or riot), 1851, an armed intervention by citizens in Lancaster County, Pennsylvania to save a fugitive slave

Geography 
 Christiana, Delaware, US
 Christiana, Pennsylvania, US
 Christiana, Tennessee, US
 Christiana, Dane County, Wisconsin, town, US
 Christiana, Vernon County, Wisconsin, town, US
 Freetown Christiania, autonomous neighborhood in Copenhagen, Denmark
 Christiana Island, Cyclades, Greece
 Christiana, Jamaica
 Christiana, North West, a town in the North West Province of South Africa
 Christiana Hundred, an unincorporated subdivision of New Castle County, Delaware, US
 Christiana, Norway, a former name (1624-1924) for the present-day Norwegian capital Oslo

People
 Christiana Figueres (born 1956), Costa Rican diplomat
 Christianna Brand (1907–1988), British crime writer and children's author
 Christiana Cavendish
 Christiana Mariana von Ziegler (1695–1760), German poet and writer
 Christiana of Schleswig-Holstein-Sonderburg-Glücksburg (1634–1701), often referred to as Christiane
 Christiana Oxenstierna (1661–1701), Swedish noble

Other
 Christiana (plant), a genus of plants in the family Malvaceae

See also
 Christiania (disambiguation)
 Cristiana, a surname (including a list of people with the name)